ដាំ ថ្នាំ or Dam Thnam is a small town in Dang Tong District in Kampot Province, Cambodia. The National Highway 3 passes through the town in a north-east-south west direction while the National Road 124 connects it to the north through Khŭm Sráng several kilometres west of the town. The town lies along the National Highway 3 which connects it to the town of Chhuk to the north-east and Kampot on the Gulf of Thailand.

Towns in Cambodia
Populated places in Kampot province